The Special Mobile Force is a paramilitary unit with its main function to ensure the internal and external security of Mauritius. As Mauritius has no dedicated military, the SMF forms part of the Mauritius Police Force, with its personnel on long-term rotation from the police force. It also consists of a branch of special forces, namely the G.I.P.M (Groupe intervention de la Police Mauricien), which totals no more than 300 highly trained men.

History
The SMF was formed following the withdrawal of the British garrison on Mauritius in 1960. The primary task of the SMF when it was formed was to ensure the internal and external security of the country. As formed, the SMF was made up of members of the local police force and Mauritian veterans of the Second World War.

Organisation
The SMF is formed as a battlegroup consisting of approximately 1,500 men led by a Commanding Officer. The majority of these men form five motorised infantry companies. In addition, there are two squadrons equipped with armoured vehicles and an engineering squadron. Although the SMF is not a military unit, it is organised along military lines, with training based on basic military doctrine. Some members of the SMF undergo commando training or "specialist" training, dependent on their skills. Although the primary role of the SMF is the internal and external security of Mauritius, it is also used in several other roles such as ceremonial guards of honour, search and rescue operations, bomb disposal, debris clearance and opening of roads after cyclones and other emergencies.

Badge and motto
The badge of the SMF is made up of a wreath of oak leaves surmounted by the national coat of arms. Within the wreath are the letters S and F, with a lightning flash between them, to symbolise the letters "SMF". Beneath the wreath is a scroll with the name "Special Mobile Force Mauritius".

The first motto of the SMF was The Difficult We Do Immediately. The Impossible Takes A Little Longer. This was then changed to the current motto We'll Do It. What Is It.

Alliances
 – The Rifles

References

External links
 

Law enforcement in Mauritius
1960 establishments in Mauritius